Heat Ray may refer to:
Active Denial System, also known as "heat ray", a non-lethal, directed-energy weapon
In science fiction, the Heat-Ray was a weapon used by the Martians in H. G. Wells' The War of the Worlds and its offshoots
Archimedes Heat Ray
Alternate name for Godzilla's atomic blast.
A weapon in the juvenile science fiction/adventure novel Danny Dunn and the Heat Ray

See also
 Infrared radiation
 Heat radiation
 Heat lamp which produces heat radiation
 Heating element which generates heat radiation